Eric Jones (born July 12, 1977) is a former part-time NASCAR driver. He ran in the Busch Series and had some of his best success in the Craftsman Truck Series. He won one NASCAR Midwest Series race before moving up to major NASCAR.

Motorsports career results

NASCAR
(key) (Bold – Pole position awarded by qualifying time. Italics – Pole position earned by points standings or practice time. * – Most laps led.)

Busch Series

Craftsman Truck Series

ARCA Bondo/Mar-Hyde Series
(key) (Bold – Pole position awarded by qualifying time. Italics – Pole position earned by points standings or practice time. * – Most laps led.)

References

External links
 



1977 births
ARCA Menards Series drivers
Living people
NASCAR drivers
People from Granger, Iowa
Racing drivers from Iowa